Neil Claude Cross (né Gadd; born 9 February 1969) is a British novelist and scriptwriter, best known as the creator of the drama series Luther and Hard Sun. He is also the showrunner for the TV adaptation of The Mosquito Coast, which began airing in 2021.

Life and career
Neil Claude Gadd was born in Bristol on 9 February 1969, to unhappily married parents, Alan and Edna ( Noyes) Gadd. He was the youngest of their four children.
 His mother ran away when he was five, returned two years later and took him to Edinburgh with Derek Cross, a White South African who was to become his stepfather and whose surname he would adopt.

Neil Cross graduated from the University of Leeds in 1994 with a degree in English and Theology, and received his Masters in English in the year following. His initial career was solely as a novelist, beginning with Mr In-Between, which was published in 1998 (and adapted into a film in 2001).

He later worked into television, writing an episode of the spy drama Spooks in 2006 before becoming lead writer on the sixth and seventh series of the show. He has written for The Fixer and Doctor Who ("The Rings of Akhaten" and "Hide"). In 2010 he wrote a new adaptation of Whistle and I'll Come to You, from the story by M. R. James.

He has created three television series: BBC crime thrillers Luther and Hard Sun (for which he wrote all the episodes); and Crossbones, an action adventure pirate series for NBC (co-created with James V. Hart and Amanda Welles). Cross co-wrote the screenplay for the 2013 film Mama.

He has continued to write novels, including Always the Sun, which was long-listed for the Booker Prize, Burial and Captured; and has written a memoir Heartland, which was short-listed for the PEN/Ackerley Prize for literary autobiography of excellence. His most recent novel, Luther: The Calling, was published in 2011. In 2019 it was announced he was adapting Burial into what became the ITV series The Sister.In 2011, Cross was included in Variety magazine's list of "10 Screenwriters to Watch".

Filmography

 Television

 Film 

 Bibliography 
 Mr In-Between (1998), initially to be entitled Adrenochrome
 Christendom (1999)
 Holloway Falls (2003)
 Always the Sun (2004)
 Heartland (a memoir) (2006)
 Natural History (2007)
 Burial (2009)
 Captured (2010)
 Luther: The Calling (2011)

 Awards and nominations 
Luther Series 1
 Winner, Luther, Mystery Writers of America Edgar Award for Best Teleplay in 2010 (Episode 1).
 Nominee, Luther, Mystery Writers of America Edgar Award for Best Teleplay in 2010 (Episode 4).
 Nominee, Luther, NAACP Image Award, Outstanding Television Movie, Mini-Series or Dramatic Special

Luther Series 2
 Nominee, Neil Cross, Primetime Emmy Award 2012, Outstanding Writing for a Miniseries, Movie or a Dramatic Special
 Nominee, Luther, Primetime Emmy Award 2012, Outstanding Miniseries or Movie
 Winner, Luther, Creative Diversity Network, Radio Times Drama award 2011
 Winner, Luther, Royal Television Society, Best Drama Series 2011
 Nominee, Luther, Broadcast Television Journalists Association Critics' Choice Television Awards 2012, Best Movie/Miniseries

Luther Series 3
 Nominee, Neil Cross, Primetime Emmy Award 2014, Outstanding Writing for a Miniseries, Movie or a Dramatic Special 
 Nominee, Luther, Primetime Emmy Award 2013, Outstanding Miniseries

Books
 Winner, Luther: The Calling, Ngaio Marsh Award, 2012
 Longlisted, Luther: The Calling, Theakston's Old Peculier Crime Novel of the Year Award 2012
 Finalist, Captured, Ngaio Marsh Award, New Zealand, 2011
 Finalist, Burial, Ngaio Marsh Award,(NZ) 2010
 Shortlisted, Heartland, PEN/Ackerley Prize for literary autobiography 2006 
 Long-listed, Always the Sun'', Man Booker Prize 2004

References

External links

Neil Cross author page on the Simon & Schuster (UK publisher) website
Neil Cross author page on the Open Road (US publisher) website

1969 births
Writers from Bristol
Living people
New Zealand crime fiction writers
New Zealand male novelists
New Zealand screenwriters
British television writers
British male screenwriters
British psychological fiction writers
British male television writers
21st-century New Zealand novelists
21st-century British male writers
Alumni of the University of Leeds
21st-century British screenwriters